The 1992 Kerry Senior Football Championship was the 92nd staging of the Kerry Senior Football Championship since its establishment by the Kerry County Board in 1889. The championship ran from 27 June to 27 September 1992.

Dr. Crokes entered the championship as the defending champions, however, they were beaten by St. Brendan's in the semi-finals.

The final was played on 27 September 1992 at Austin Stack Park in Tralee, between Mid Kerry and St. Brendan's, in what was their first ever meeting in the final. Mid Kerry won the match by 3–9 to 1–10 to claim their third championship title overall and a first title in 21 years.

Séamus Murphy was the championship's top scorer with 1-23.

Results

Preliminary  round

Round 1

Quarter-finals

Semi-finals

Final

Championship statistics

Top scorers

Overall

In a single game

Miscellaneous

 Mid Kerry won the title for the first time in 21 years.
 St. Brendan's qualified for the final for the first time.

References

Kerry Senior Football Championship
1992 in Gaelic football